Jadran is a Croatian brand of cigarettes, currently owned and manufactured by the Adris grupa (formerly known as Tvornica Duhana Rovinj), a division of British American Tobacco. Jadran means The Adriatic in South Slavic languages.

History

The brand was founded in the Socialist Republic of Croatia and quickly became one of the most popular brands in the Croatian-speaking parts of Yugoslavia, along with Opatija. The brand was mainly popular with the upper-class within Socialist Croatia, and is one of the few brands to survive after the Breakup of Yugoslavia and Croatia became its own country, along with Drina. Jadran was named after a sea, similar to other Yugoslavian brands which were named after seas and rivers like Morava, and Drava.

See also

 Tobacco smoking
 Drina (cigarette)
 Elita (cigarette)
 Filter 57 (cigarette)
 Laika (cigarette)
 Lovćen (cigarette)
 Morava (cigarette)
 Partner (cigarette)
 Smart (cigarette)
 Time (cigarette)
 Sobranie
 Jin Ling
 LD (cigarette)
 Walter Wolf (cigarette)

References

British American Tobacco brands